The 15th Pan American Games were held in Rio de Janeiro, Brazil from 13 July 2007 to 29 July 2007.

Medals

Gold

Men's Individual Road Race: Wendy Cruz

Men's Kumite (– 75 kg): Dionicio Gustavo
Women's Kumite (– 60 kg): Heidy Rodríguez

Men's Singles: Lin Ju

Men's – 58 kg: Gabriel Mercedes

Women's – 53 kg: Yudelquis Contreras

Silver

Men's Flyweight (– 51 kg): Juan Carlos Payano 
Men's Bantamweight (– 54 kg): Claudio Marrero 
Men's Middleweight (– 54 kg): Argenis Núñez

Women's Singles: Wu Xue

Women's – 49 kg: Yajaira Peguero

Men's Greco Roman (– 66 kg): Anyelo Mota

Bronze

Men's 4x400 metres: Carlos Santa, Arismendy Peguero, Yoel Tapia, and Félix Sánchez

Men's Doubles: Rolando Sebelen and Víctor Richards
Women's Singles: Aumi Guerra

Men's Light Flyweight (– 48 kg): Wilton Méndez

Individual Dressage: Yvonne Losos de Muñiz

Men's – 100 kg: Teófilo Diek
Women's – 52 kg: María García

Men's Kumite (– 60 kg): Norberto Sosa
Men's Kumite (– 70 kg): Alberto Mancebo
Men's Kumite (+ 80 kg): Juan Valdez

Women's Team: Johenny Valdez, Wu Xue and Lian Qian

Men's – 68 kg: Yacomo García Fernández

Women's – 48 kg: Guillermina Candelario
Women's – 75 kg: Yinelis Burgos

Men's Freestyle (– 120 kg): Carlos Félix
Men's Greco-Roman (– 55 kg): Jansel Ramírez
Men's Greco-Roman (– 84 kg): José Arias

Results by event

Triathlon

Men's Competition
Javier Cuevas
 1:54:49.39 — 12th place
Yean Jiménez
 1:55:52.82 — 16th place
Héctor Hernández
 2:03:43.52 — 27th place

See also
Dominican Republic at the 2008 Summer Olympics

External links
Rio 2007 Official website

Nations at the 2007 Pan American Games
P
2007